The 2010 congressional elections in Rhode Island were held on November 2, 2010, and determined who would represent Rhode Island in the United States House of Representatives. Representatives are elected for two-year terms; the elected served in the 112th Congress from January 3, 2011, until January 3, 2013.

Rhode Island has two seats in the House, apportioned according to the 2000 United States Census. Its 2009-2010 congressional delegation consisted of two Democrats, and following the election, it stayed with two Democrats.

Overview

By district
Results of the 2010 United States House of Representatives elections in Rhode Island by district:

District 1

Campaign
Incumbent Democratic Congressman Patrick J. Kennedy decided not to run for a ninth term in Congress in this solidly liberal district based in northern and eastern Rhode Island, creating an open seat.

David Cicilline, the Mayor of Providence, defeated Anthony Gemma, State Representative David Segal, and former Rhode Island Democratic Party Chairman Bill Lynch in the Democratic primary, while State Representative John Loughlin emerged as the Republican nominee. An aggressive campaign ensued, with Cicilline attacking Loughlin for wanting to privatize Social Security, a claim that Loughlin dismissed as one that "couldn't be further from the truth." Loughlin blasted Cicilline for creating "a $70 million deficit for the next mayor to deal with," which Cicilline attributed to budget cuts made by the Rhode Island General Assembly.

The Providence Journal, praising Cicilline for being "an honest, energetic, and often innovative mayor," and criticizing Loughlin for "reacting...favorably to the collection of fiscal contradictions known as the House Republicans' 'Pledge to America,'" endorsed Cicilline, calling him a "highly competent public servant."

In the end, a surprisingly close race emerged in what should have been an easy win for Cicilline, or any Democratic candidate. Though Cicilline won in the end and was sent to Washington for his first term, it was only by a six-point, 10,000 vote margin of victory.

Polling

Results

District 2

Campaign
Democratic Congressman James Langevin has represented this liberal district based in southern and western Rhode Island since he was first elected in 2000. Langevin has maintained considerable popularity in this largely supportive constituency, and did not face a real threat to his re-election from his 2008 opponent, Republican Mark Zaccaria. In the general election, Langevin was re-elected by an overwhelming margin, defeating Zaccaria and independent candidate John Matson, who garnered an impressive eight percent of the vote.

Polling

Results

References

External links
Rhode Island Board of Elections
U.S. Congress candidates for Rhode Island at Project Vote Smart
Rhode Island U.S. House from OurCampaigns.com
Campaign contributions for Rhode Island congressional races from OpenSecrets
2010 Rhode Island General Election graph of multiple polls from Pollster.com

House - Rhode Island from the Cook Political Report

Rhode Island
2010
2010 Rhode Island elections